Vincent Michael Brown (3 December 1971) is an English artist and portrait painter.

Early life 

Brown was born in Bristol in 1971. He began exhibiting and receiving portrait commissions from the age of eleven. He is a self-taught artist, although he studied for many years under noted artists both privately and in college and university.

Career 

After working for a brief time as an illustrator he focused almost entirely on portraiture, and has become a frequent exhibitor at The National Portrait Gallery (London) and the Royal Society of Portrait Painters. In 2006 he won The Holburne Museum of Art Portrait Prize and was commissioned to paint three directors of Bristol-based Aardman Animations, Nick Park, Peter Lord and David Sproxton, for the Holburne Museum of Art.

Publications 

BP Portrait Award 2004 & 2007 National Portrait Gallery (London)

Awards 

The Holburne Portrait Prize (Holburne Museum of Art)
Peoples Choice Award
The St Cuthberts Mill Award
&Excellence in Watercolour 2006 & 2007 Royal West of England Academy

Important portraits 

 Sir Simon Alexander Bowes-Lyon
 Nick Park
 Peter Lord
 David Sproxton

External links
 Artist's Website
 Holburne Museum of Art Website
 Aardman Animations Website
 The National Portrait Gallery
 Royal West of England Academy of Art website

1971 births
Living people
Artists from Bristol
20th-century English painters
English male painters
21st-century English painters
21st-century English male artists
Culture in Bristol
20th-century English male artists